PEC or Pan European Crossing is a fibre optic cable network that links the European Union and the United Kingdom.  It has a submarine telecommunications cable system segment crossing the English Channel linking the United Kingdom, Belgium, and France.

One cable has landing points in:
Dumpton Gap, Broadstairs, Kent, United Kingdom
Bredene near Ostend, West Flanders, Belgium

The other cable has landing points in:
Seaford, East Sussex, United Kingdom
Veules-les-Roses, France

References
 Alcatel-Lucent website

Submarine communications cables in the English Channel
Belgium–United Kingdom relations
France–United Kingdom relations
Bredene